The 2003 Tostitos Fiesta Bowl was a college football bowl game that was the designated Bowl Championship Series (BCS) National Championship Game for the 2002 NCAA Division I-A football season, taking place on January 3, 2003 at Sun Devil Stadium in Tempe, Arizona. The Ohio State Buckeyes, co-champions of the Big Ten Conference, defeated the heavily favored Miami Hurricanes, champions of the Big East Conference, in double overtime by a final score of 31 - 24. The game was only the second overtime result in either the BCS or its predecessors, the Bowl Alliance and Bowl Coalition, following the 2000 Orange Bowl between the Alabama Crimson Tide and the Michigan Wolverines. By virtue of their victory, Ohio State became the first team in college football history to finish a season with a 14-0 record.

In the midst of a resurgence after experiencing turmoil during the 1990s, Miami had won the previous season's national championship in dominant fashion and entered the Fiesta Bowl with a 34-game win streak. Ohio State, meanwhile, had narrowly missed national championship opportunities in the 90s, and their most recently claimed championship followed the 1970 season. The two teams represented a contrast of styles: Ohio State played an older variation of power football that emphasized running and dominant defense, while Miami used the speed of their skill position players to overwhelm opponents. Leading up to the game, there was speculation as to whether the Buckeyes would be able to contend with the speed advantage of the Hurricanes, who were installed as 11.5 point favorites.

Following the game, controversy arose surrounding the validity of a crucial pass interference penalty during the first overtime period, without which a Hurricanes victory would have resulted. The trajectories of the two programs subsequently diverged after the season: Ohio State maintained national competitiveness despite two national championship losses later in the decade (they eventually went on to win another national championship in 2014), while Miami fell from their elite status, eventually becoming mired in a scandal from which they've yet to fully recover. Considering the differing courses of the two programs, the 2002 Fiesta Bowl and its controversial ending have become known as pivotal moments in the greater history of American college football.

Background

Ohio State had started the season ranked #13 after losing to South Carolina in the Outback Bowl the previous year. It was head coach Jim Tressel's second year with the team, and he had the experienced Buckeyes looking to win the Big Ten title. After gaining national respect by beating a top 10 Washington State team, Ohio State would go on to ride their strong defense and surprising offense to a 13-0 regular season. Freshman star Maurice Clarett highlighted their elite rushing attack, while quarterback Craig Krenzel managed the games well by throwing to talented wideouts Michael Jenkins and Chris Gamble. They had won 6 games by 7 points or fewer, and the last 3 games by a slim margin of 16 points. Many of the Buckeye's close wins were over mediocre competition. Two of the closest wins were a 23-19 win over 7-7 Conference USA team Cincinnati on a pair of dropped TD passes with under a minute left, and a 10-6 win over 7-6 Purdue on the Holy Buckeye play. The Buckeyes also needed overtime to defeat a 5-7 Illinois team.

The Buckeyes took advantage and finished their season with a close win against Michigan, who were ranked 9th nationally. They held on to a 14-9 lead with an interception in the endzone by safety Will Allen in the final seconds. Even though they were undefeated, the Buckeyes were heading into the Fiesta Bowl as an 11.5 point underdog, but they had strong motivation from teams leaders like 3x All-American safety Mike Doss.

Throughout the season the defending national champion Miami Hurricanes continued a historic winning streak. The regular season ended with a perfect record extending the streak to 34 games. Their roster included future NFL players on both offense and defense including Willis McGahee, Ken Dorsey, Andre Johnson, Kellen Winslow Jr., Jonathan Vilma, D.J. Williams, William Joseph, Jerome McDougle, Antrel Rolle, Kelly Jennings, Roscoe Parrish and Sean Taylor. Their offensive line had also produced 3 straight 1,000 yard seasons by 3 different running backs, and were leading the nation in fewest sacks allowed. They were an overwhelming favorite to win their 2nd consecutive national title.

The Hurricanes, however, had not been as dominant as in 2001, and had a pair of lucky wins. The Hurricanes beat Florida State  on a wide left field goal, building on the previous Wide Right legacy. The Hurricanes also trailed a  Rutgers team that finished 1-11  going into the fourth quarter by a score of 17-14, and would have been losing 24-8 if they ironically hadn't been beneficiaries of a controversial pass interference call that wiped out a 100 yard interception return. Miami's 3 prime non-conference opponents-Florida, Tennessee, and the FSU team that nearly beat Miami- had not been as good as expected. Some people believed that the 2002 Miami team was living off the reputation of the 2001 team, and that the game could be more competitive than expected.

Game summary

First quarter
The Miami Hurricanes won the coin toss for first possession options and elected to defer their choice until the 2nd half kickoff. The Buckeyes chose to receive the kickoff and Miami decided to defend the north goal. The kickoff resulted in a touchback but the Buckeyes were flagged for having 12 men on the field, moving the spot of the ball back to the Buckeye 15-yard line. The Buckeyes' first series resulted in a three-and-out, and Buckeye punter Andy Groom's 56-yard punt resulted in Miami beginning their first possession on their own 20.

During the first down, the Hurricanes' quarterback Ken Dorsey was sacked for a loss of 3 yards. Running back Willis McGahee was tackled on the second down in the backfield for a loss of 2 yards. On third and 15, Dorsey completed a 20-yard pass to Andre Johnson for a 1st down. A couple of plays later, Dorsey again completed a pass to Andre Johnson for 11 yards. The next play saw Dorsey sacked again, this time for a 5-yard loss. The Miami offense failed to gain a first down and punter Freddie Capshaw punted the ball 43 yards. Ohio State received the ball on its one-yard line.

After three downs, the Buckeyes punted. Groom kicked the ball 44 yards where Roscoe Parrish made a fair catch at the Miami 48-yard line. Miami's drive started out slowly with a 1-yard loss on a run by McGahee, but the next play saw Dorsey throw a 28-yard first down pass to Kellen Winslow, Jr. Three plays later, Dorsey sidestepped blitzing safety Donnie Nickey and threw to Parrish for a 25-yard touchdown to put Miami up 7-0 (after Todd Sievers's extra point) with 4:09 left in the first quarter.

Ohio State's Maurice Hall returned the ensuing kickoff for 15 yards. On the first play from scrimmage, Buckeye quarterback Craig Krenzel threw an interception to Miami safety Sean Taylor. On its first play after this, the Miami quarterback completed a 14-yard pass to Andre Johnson for another first down. McGahee was tackled twice for a net loss of 4 yards, and Dorsey's pass on third-and-15 was 2 yards short of a first down. On fourth down Miami's Capshaw punted 44 yards for a touchback. The Buckeyes took over at their 20-yard line, but got a false start penalty, moving them to their 15-yard line. The Buckeyes did not get a touchdown before the quarter ended.

Second quarter
After a quick first down at the end of the 1st quarter the Ohio State drive stalled as Maurice Clarett was tackled for no gain, and then a 7-yard loss, on the next two plays. Groom punted for 63 yards to the Miami 7-yard line where Parrish returned it 6 yards.

The Hurricanes moved the ball after a 10-yard holding penalty for another first down. Ohio State responded after the mental error when cornerback Dustin Fox intercepted Ken Dorsey's pass, which was intended for Parrish, at the Miami 49 and returned it 12 yards.

Ohio State picked up a first down in 2 plays but come up short on a long 3rd and 12 to make it 4th and 1. The Buckeyes uncharacteristically decided to fake the field goal attempt and have kick holder Andy Groom (otherwise a punter) carry the ball on an option, but the Buckeyes were stopped for no gain on the play and turned the ball over on downs.

Miami began their next possession with another penalty. The Hurricanes were called for an illegal formation penalty for 5 yards, but Dorsey quickly rebounded as he completed a 14-yard pass to Ethenic Sands for a Miami 1st down. Dorsey again completed a pass on the next play to Jason Geathers for a 4-yard gain. The Hurricanes tried to pass two more times, but the first pass was incomplete and the second was intercepted on a deflection by Buckeye safety Mike Doss, who returned the ball 35 yards to the Miami 17-yard line.

A few plays later Krenzel threw 8 yards for a first down to Chris Vance. Ohio State proceeded to move the ball to the 2-yard line, with the help of a Miami offsides penalty. Krenzel carried the ball into the endzone on 4th and 1 from the 2 for a touchdown. Mike Nugent kicked the PAT to tie the score at 7 - 7 with a little over 2 minutes to go in the first half.

Nugent's kickoff after the score went to the back of the endzone for a touchback. On the Hurricane's first play from scrimmage Ken Dorsey was sacked and fumbled the ball. The Buckeye's Darrion Scott recovered the fumble on the Miami 14-yard line. 2 plays later, and again with the help of a Miami offsides penalty, Maurice Clarett ran for a 7-yard touchdown. After another successful PAT by Nugent the Buckeyes were up 14-7.

Nugent kicked off for another touchback, and Miami chose to run out the clock. The Buckeyes led at half time, 14–7.

Third quarter
On the first play of the second half, Ohio State kicker Mike Nugent sent the ball into the endzone for yet another touchback. Miami began with the ball on the 20-yard line but fell short on a 3rd and 3 to make it 4th and 1 and elected to punt. Freddie Capshaw punted the ball 43 yards and the ball was downed at the Ohio State 28-yard line.

The Buckeyes began the drive with good momentum as they handed off to Clarett twice, resulting in a 4- and 10-yard gain respectively and a Buckeye first down. Ohio State was flagged for a 5-yard offsides penalty on the next play. The Buckeyes were stopped twice in a row to bring up a 3rd and 15.

On third down, Krenzel threw a deep ball to Chris Gamble for a 57-yard reception to the Miami 6-yard line and an Ohio State first down. Krenzel then threw an interception to Sean Taylor who returned it 28 yards. However, the ball was stripped by Maurice Clarett causing a fumble which was recovered by Clarett. The turnover resulted in 3 points for OSU when Nugent converted a field goal that put the Buckeyes up 17–7.

On the following kickoff the Hurricanes' Andre Johnson returned the ball 39 yards before getting tackled. Again, the Buckeyes defense held Miami to a 3 and out and forced a punt. Capshaw had a 43-yard punt down to the Ohio State 10-yard line where Chris Gamble fielded the ball for a 1-yard gain. Antrel Rolle was called for a kick catch interference penalty of 10 yards on the punt.

Ohio State began their next drive at their own 21-yard line, and only moved the ball 4 yards before calling in Groom to punt the ball 30 yards out of bounds. Miami's next possession consisted of a couple of big plays including a 23-yard reception and a 7-yard reception by Winslow from Dorsey. Miami then faced 1st and goal from the Ohio State 9-yard line. Willis McGahee ran 9 yards for a Miami touchdown. Sievers PAT kick was good and the score became 17–14, Buckeyes.

Sievers kickoff resulted in a touchback and gave the ball to Ohio State at their own 20-yard line with 2:11 left in the 3rd quarter. Clarett got the ball on 1st and 10 and was tackled for no gain. Krenzel ran for 4 yards making it 3rd and 6, and then took the ball himself once more for a 3-yard gain on the final play of the 3rd quarter with the score 17–14 in favor of the Buckeyes.

Fourth quarter
The 4th Quarter started out with a 49-yard punt out of bounds by Andy Groom giving Miami the ball at their own 24-yard line. Miami once again put a drive together earning 3 first downs including a 9-yard rush by McGahee who was injured and out for the rest of the game after the play. McGahee's injury was caused by a shoulder leading hit by safety Will Allen. The tackle ruptured all three ligaments in McGahee's knee, putting his career in doubt. (McGahee subsequently recovered from his injury and went on to a successful professional football career.)

The next plays were a Dorsey completion to Ethenic Sands for 9 yards, and a Dorsey completion to Winslow for a gain of 11 yards. The Canes were then held forced to bring out kicker Todd Sievers to attempt a 54-yard field goal. Sievers's attempt was wide right and the Buckeyes took over on downs.

The Buckeyes put a drive together, also earning 3 first downs including a 10-yard completion from Krenzel to Michael Jenkins, a 12-yard completion from Krenzel to Gamble, and a 6-yard rush by Clarett. However, the Miami defense held and forced Ohio State to try a field goal. Nugent's attempt at a 42-yard field goal missed the uprights wide right. Miami then took over the ball at its own 25 with 6:36 left in the game.

On the first play of the Miami drive, Dorsey hooked up with Kellen Winslow for an 11-yard gain and a first down. Jarrett Payton then rushed for 5 yards before Dorsey and Winslow hooked up yet again for a 10-yard gain and another Miami 1st down. Miami was stopped two plays in a row bringing up 3rd and 8 when Dorsey passed to Parrish for a 34-yard completion, but Parrish fumbled the ball at the hands of cornerback Dustin Fox. Nickelback Will Allen recovered the fumble for the Buckeyes.

Krenzel then rushed for one more 1st down on a 4-yard gain until they were held by the Miami D and were forced to punt once again. On 3rd and 6  a catch by Chris Gamble was ruled incomplete due to his being out of bounds (even though replay showed Gamble probably caught the ball inbounds). TV replays also showed that Gamble was seemingly held on the play by a Miami defender, and Krenzel may have been hit late. However, TV replays also indicate that Ohio State might not have snapped the ball before the play clock expired, and possibly should have been called for delay of game, which would have turned the third and six into 3rd and 11. Furthermore, Ohio State would not have actually been able to knee out the clock if this had been ruled in bounds (or ruled defensive holding or a late hit), because there was 2:19 left on the clock and Miami still had one timeout.  Under replay rules that were passed before the 2005 and 2006 seasons, replay officials would have been allowed to review if Gamble was in bounds, but would not have been allowed to review the play for defensive holding or a late hit.   The Buckeyes were forced to punt and Groom punted the ball 44 yards.

Miami's returner, Parrish, ran the ball back 50 yards before being tackled by Groom and Doss. Miami started their drive at the Buckeye 26-yard line with 2:02 left in the game. Some Ohio State fans claim that Miami should have been called for a block in the back at about the Miami 40 yard line, which would have meant the Hurricanes would have started the possession from about the Miami 30 yard line rather than the Ohio State 26 yard line. Miami ran 3 plays for a total of 3 yards and decide to take a timeout on 4th and 7 with 3 seconds left in the game. Miami elected to have Sievers attempt a 40-yard field goal. Tressel called a timeout to try to ice the kicker. Ohio State then used its last timeout in a further attempt to rattle Sievers. The 40 yard attempt was successful, however, and tied the score at 17 with no time remaining in regulation play, forcing the game into overtime.

First overtime
Ohio State won the toss at the start of overtime and chose to be on defense first. Miami started their OT drive out slow, but on 2nd and 10, Dorsey completed a 9-yard pass to Andre Johnson to make it 3rd and 1 from the 16-yard line. Jarrett Payton then rushed for 8 yards to give Miami another 1st down and a 1st and goal from the OSU 8-yard line. Two plays later, Dorsey hooked up with Kellen Winslow in the endzone for a 7-yard touchdown pass. Pass interference was called on the defense, but the penalty was declined. Miami led 24–17 at this point, forcing the Buckeyes to score a touchdown on their next possession to keep the game alive.

On the Buckeyes' turn to try to score from the Miami 25-yard line, Krenzel came up with a 5-yard rush on the first play. Ohio State had a 2nd and 5 on the Miami 20-yard line and a false start penalty was called against the Buckeyes bringing them back 5 yards to the 25. On 2nd and 10 Krenzel got sacked for a 4-yard loss bringing up 3rd and 14. Krenzel then threw an incomplete pass to Clarett to make it 4th and 14 and their last chance to get a 1st down. Krenzel came through and completed a 17-yard pass to Jenkins for a 1st down on the Miami 12-yard line.

Krenzel then threw another incomplete pass to Jenkins which brought up 2nd and 10 where Krenzel took the ball himself and rushed for 7 yards down to the Miami 5-yard line. The third down was an incomplete pass by Krenzel, which brought up 4th down and 3. Krenzel attempted a pass to Gamble, but the ball bounced off Gamble's hands and was called an incomplete pass by the line judge. The Miami fans and team, believing the game to be over, began to rush the field. However, Terry Porter, a field judge had thrown a late flag in the end zone. The penalty was defensive pass interference, called on Miami defender Glenn Sharpe. As a result, Ohio State received the ball on the 2-yard line with an automatic first down. With a fresh set of downs, Krenzel rushed for a 1-yard touchdown on 3rd down. Nugent's kick was good and tied the score at 24 sending the game into a second overtime.

Second overtime
In the second overtime, the teams switched possession order, giving the ball first to Ohio State. The Buckeyes started strong with Lydell Ross rushing for a 9-yard gain on 1st down. 3rd and 1 came up and Krenzel rushed for 5 yards and an Ohio State 1st down. For 1st and 10 on the Miami 11, Krenzel completed a 6-yard pass to Jenkins which brought up 2nd and 4 on the Miami 5-yard line. Krenzel then handed off the ball to Maurice Clarett for a 5-yard rushing touchdown putting Ohio State up 31–24 after a successful Nugent PAT.

Miami had to score a touchdown and then either kick the PAT to tie the game and send it to a 3rd overtime, or go for a 2-point conversion and the win. The Hurricanes drew a couple of blanks to put them in a 4th and 3 situation where Dorsey completed a 7-yard pass to Winslow for a 1st down. A facemask penalty was called on Ohio State during the play to make it 1st and 5 for Miami from the Buckeye 6-yard line. Ken Dorsey then threw an incomplete pass to Andre Johnson, but a pass interference call on a Buckeyes defender gave Miami a 1st and goal from the 2-yard line. The Buckeye defense held Miami to only one yard in the next 3 plays to bring up a big 4th and goal on the 1-yard line. Ken Dorsey threw a pass as he was being hit by linebacker Cie Grant; it was incomplete, ending the game with Ohio State winning the BCS National Championship 31–24.

Scoring summary
1st Quarter
Miami – Roscoe Parrish 25-yard pass from Ken Dorsey (Todd Sievers kick) 4:09 – UM 7, OSU 0

2nd Quarter
Ohio State – Craig Krenzel 1-yard run (Mike Nugent kick)  2:28 – OSU 7, UM 7
Ohio State – Maurice Clarett 7-yard run (Nugent kick) 1:10  – OSU 14, UM 7

3rd Quarter
Ohio State – Nugent 44-yard field goal  8:33 – OSU 17, UM 7
Miami – Willis McGahee 9-yard run (Sievers kick)  2:11 – OSU 17, UM 14

4th Quarter
Miami – Sievers 40-yard field goal 0:00 – UM 17, OSU 17

1st Overtime
Miami – Kellen Winslow, Jr. 7-yard pass from Dorsey (Sievers kick) – UM 24, OSU 17
Ohio State – Krenzel 1-yard run (Nugent kick) – OSU 24, UM 24

2nd Overtime
Ohio State – Clarett 5-yard run (Nugent kick) – OSU 31, UM 24

Aftermath
The amount of future NFL talent that played in the game is considered highly exceptional. Of the 43 players who started in the game (OSU's Chris Gamble started on both offense and defense), 37 of them were eventually NFL draft picks (including 18 first-rounders). Of the 100 players who played in the game, 52 went on to be drafted and 58 went on to play in the NFL.

Controversy

The pass interference penalty called against Miami in the first overtime period faced immediate scrutiny. During instant replay analysis following the call on the field, Fouts and Jackson discussed the merits of the penalty, which Fouts thrice proclaimed as a "bad call." Both announcers pointed out contact against Gamble by Sharpe that could have been a penalty; Jackson suggested that it may have been defensive holding, to which Fouts responded, "They called pass interference, Keith."

The play had proceeded thusly: at the snap, Sharpe jammed Gamble at the line of scrimmage as he ran a fade route. Attempting to escape, Gamble broke off his route while Sharpe maintained contact. At the top of the route, both Gamble and Sharpe jumped for the ball, which bounced out of Gamble's outstretched arms; the predominant camera angle used for instant replay focused on this jump for the ball at the end of the play. The line judge signaled incomplete, but after a delay of several seconds, field judge Terry Porter threw a penalty flag. The delay had allowed for members of the Miami sideline to storm the field in celebration, and they had to clear the field before play could resume. Initially signaling for defensive holding, Porter revised his signal to pass interference before the call was announced.

After the game, sportswriters criticized the call and its influence on the outcome of the game. Writing for Sports Illustrated, Rick Reilly commented, "I think Porter choked. I think he didn't know what to call, and so he did the stupidest thing possible. Maybe he felt the coming wrath of a stadium that was 90% Ohio State red and started wondering if he'd make it out of there with both his kidneys." Dennis Dodd of CBS Sports also claimed that Porter "choked," and both writers criticized how long Porter took to throw the penalty flag after the play. Dodd wrote:

Months after the game, the Florida newspaper The Orlando Sentinel published, "The Republic of Texas had 'Remember the Alamo.' The Republic of Miami has 'Remember Terry Porter.' He's the ref who threw the pass-interference flag that cost UM the national title."

Numerous Miami players and coaches have expressed their displeasure toward the call. Coker stated, "Whether it be a good call, a bad call, it was a poorly timed call, you know? I just think you don't make that call at that stage of the game." Sharpe denies that he committed a penalty and criticized Porter for refusing to admit that he made a mistake. Linebacker Jonathan Vilma and former tight end Jeremy Shockey both called the penalty "bullshit," and linebacker DJ Williams said that he felt like "part of my legacy had been stolen from me." Williams, former wide receiver Santana Moss, former tackle Bryant McKinnie, and assistant coach Don Soldinger each noted that the initial appearance of victory took Miami out of the competitive mindset, shifting game momentum and forcing them to refocus. On the contrary, Miami safety Sean Taylor dismissed the call's influence, stating, "Officials make the calls. That wasn't a turning point. We should have never been in that position."

Both contemporary and retrospective analyses have also defended Porter and noted that the call was correct. Despite his initial criticism, Dodd later changed his stance on the call, stating that due to the predominant camera angle used during the broadcast, the foul occurred several seconds before previously thought. Dodd continued, "Whether it takes five seconds or five minutes, they teach officials, above all, to get the call right. Porter did." Dave Parry, then the Big Ten Conference supervisor of officials, also noted the camera angle's influence on viewer perception:

Kyle Clark of The Daily Toreador called those who disputed the call "morons," "idiots," and "ignoramuses," further noting that defensive holding constitutes pass interference if the foul occurs while the pass is in the air. Writing for The Oklahoman, Berry Tramel criticized the responses from both Reilly and Fouts:

The National Association of Sports Officials also criticized Reilly in a letter to Sports Illustrated that stated, "Not once – not once! – did Reilly have the decency to state a fact: The call was correct. Terry Porter took his time and got the play right."

Addressing the delay, Porter said he wanted to make sure that the call was correct, explaining, “I replayed it in my mind. I wanted to make double sure that it was the right call.” An analysis by the Big XII Conference concluded that Sharpe committed four penalties on the play, with two instances of defensive holding and two instances of pass interference. In 2007, Porter's call was selected by Referee Magazine as one of the 18 best calls in sports history, and the penalty was also the focus of the ESPN Show The Top 5 Reasons You Can't Blame... in an episode titled "The Top 5 Reasons You Can't Blame the Referees for Miami losing the 2003 Fiesta Bowl."

Nonetheless, popular perception of the call has remained negative. Jared Shanker of The Patriot-News ranked the call as the third worst of all-time, and Athlon Sports ranked it second on a similar list in 2010.  Brian Scott of Bleacher Report labeled it the worst call of all-time and excoriated Porter, stating, "[...] if the call wasn’t so obvious that he had to think about it, perhaps he shouldn’t have thrown the flag on fourth down in overtime at the national freaking championship game." Dorsey also dismissed Porter's explanation of his delay in throwing the penalty flag, stating, "My whole thing is good calls and bad calls happen, but just make the call. Don't wait as long as you did to throw the flag. I've heard the explanation that, 'I was replaying it in my mind.' Come on."

References

External links
 ESPN.com recap

Fiesta Bowl
Fiesta Bowl
BCS National Championship Game
Miami Hurricanes football bowl games
Ohio State Buckeyes football bowl games
College football controversies
2003 in sports in Arizona
January 2003 sports events in the United States